Martindale–Brightwood is a historic neighborhood located on the near northeast side of Indianapolis, Indiana. It is bounded by 30th Street, Massachusetts Avenue, 21st Street, Sherman Drive, the Northfolk Southern Railroad tracks, and the Monon Trail.

History
Martindale-Brightwood is a combination of two originally distinct neighborhoods, Martindale and Brightwood, both dating back to the 1870s and both being defined early-on by their proximity to railroads. The two were linked to one another in 1992 with the formation of the Martindale-Brightwood Community Development Corporation. It is one of Indianapolis' oldest neighborhoods.

Brightwood
Brightwood was platted in 1872 and incorporated as an independent municipality in 1876. Founding members of the municipality included Clements A. Greenleaf (manufacturer), John L. Mothershead (manufacturer), William D. Wiles (merchant), and Daniel H. Wiles (merchant). Before its annexation by Indianapolis in 1897, Brightwood developed into a small town. In 1889 it housed nearly 4,900 Hoosiers. Brightwood was initially a thriving railroad center populated by mostly white immigrants, many of which were first-generation Americans born in Germany and Ireland.

Martindale
Martindale was established in 1873 by Frederick Ruschaupt and Gustave Zschech. It was originally a blue collar community populated by a significant portion of the city's African American population, who inhabited the area as a result of forced segregation in the 1800s. The area was neither an independent municipality like Brightwood, nor did it house as many commercial properties. Many of the neighborhood's initial residents worked at companies along the Monon Railroad, including: Atlas Engine Works, Eaglesfield Lumber, Indianapolis Gas Works, Indianapolis Veneer Company,  the National Motor Vehicle Company, and Thomas & Skinner Steel Projects.

Layout
Several public and private facilities can be found within Martindale-Brightwood. These include: the Brightwood Community Center, Martin University, the Juvenile Detention Center, the Edna Martin Christian Center, three public elementary schools, one fire station, five public parks, Genesis Plaza, and close to 100 churches.

Popular culture
In 2006, journalist Kim Hood Jacobs wrote and produced Reviving the Spirit: the story of Martindale Brightwood for WFYI. The story focused on the determination of residents to combat lingering issues in the Martindale-Brightwood community (increased crime, environmental contamination, poverty).

In June of 2016, Martindale-Brightwood was recognized by Mayor Joe Hogsett for the neighborhood's commitment to redevelopment.

The Martindale-Brightwood neighborhood is a prominent feature in the Harrison Center's 2021 film Rasheeda's Freedom Day, which recreates the harrowing story of long-time resident JoAnna LeNoir.

Demographics
Martindale-Brightwood has a population of 12,578 residents. The residents are predominantly African American and the median age is 37 years old.

See also
List of Indianapolis neighborhoods
Martin University

References

Neighborhoods in Indianapolis
1873 establishments in Indiana
1872 establishments in Indiana